Prometheus cochrus is the only species in the monotypic moth genus Prometheus of the family Castniidae. The genus erected by Jacob Hübner in 1824. The species was first described by Johan Christian Fabricius in 1787. It is found in Brazil and Paraguay.

References

Moths described in 1787
Castniidae